Gjurmime albanologjike (Albanological reconnaissance) is a scientific magazine published by the Albanological Institute of Pristina, in Kosovo. The first issue came out in 1962 and since then has been a major contributor to all albanology fields study. The contributors come from Kosovo, Albania, other Albanian populated areas in the Balkans, as well as some Arbëreshë.

Since 1970 it has been split into three components: History Sciences, Philological Sciences, and Folklore and Ethnology.

History 
The magazine started as a scientific bulletin of the Albanology Cathedre, part of the Faculty of Philosophy of the University of Prishtina. Its editor-in-chief was Idriz Ajeti.

Initially, it was structured as a yearly collection of articles and studies. One volume was published in 1962, followed by 1965, and 1966. The Albanological Institute of Pristina was reconstructed in 1967, and took over the magazine starting from 1968. At the time, Gjurmime Albanologjike came out as a semi-annual. In 1971, with the establishment of additional branches and disciplines inside the institute, the magazine split in three series: the History Sciences series with Ali Hadri as editor, the Philological Science series led by Idriz Ajeti, and the Folklore and Ethnology series led by Anton Çeta. The series continued to be published as yearly volumes.

Before its split in series, the magazine focused on researches on Albanian philology and general history. After that, it covered broader thematic covering all periods from antiquity till today, plus contemporary history specific topics, as well as a bibliography of possible references for further studies and researches.

See also
Studia Albanica
Gjuha Shqipe

Further reading
50 vjet Gjurmime Albanologjike, 1962-2012 (50 years of Gjurmime Albanologjike), Emine Fetahu-Abdixhiku, Prishtina: Instituti Albanologjik, 2014.

References 

1962 establishments in Kosovo
Linguistics journals
Albanian-language journals
Publications established in 1962
Albanian studies